The American Music Award for Favorite Album – Pop/Rock has been awarded since 1974. Years reflect the year in which the awards were presented, for works released in the previous year (until 2003 onward when awards were handed out on November of the same year). The all-time winner in this category is Taylor Swift with 5 wins. Swift has also received the most number of nominations in this category than any other artist. Justin Bieber and Michael Jackson are tied for the most wins among male artists, with 3 wins each.

Winners and nominees

1970s

1980s

1990s

2000s

2010s
{| class="wikitable" width="100%"
|-
! width="10%"| Year
! width="35%"| Artist
! width="50%"| Album
! width="5%"| Ref
|-
! rowspan="4" align="center"| 2010
|- style="background:#c5e1f0"
| Justin Bieber
| My World 2.0
| rowspan="4" align="center"| 
|-
| Eminem
| Recovery
|-
| Katy Perry
| Teenage Dream
|-
! rowspan="4" align="center"| 2011
|- style="background:#c5e1f0"
| Adele
| 21
| rowspan="4" align="center"| 
|-
| Lady Gaga
| Born This Way
|-
| Rihanna
| Loud
|-
! rowspan="5" align="center"| 2012
|- style="background:#c5e1f0"
| Justin Bieber
| Believe
| rowspan="5" align="center"| 
|-
| Maroon 5
| Overexposed
|-
| Nicki Minaj
| Pink Friday: Roman Reloaded
|-
| One Direction
| Up All Night
|-
! rowspan="4" align="center"| 2013
|- style="background:#c5e1f0"
| One Direction
| Take Me Home
| rowspan="4" align="center"| 
|-
| Taylor Swift
| Red
|-
| Justin Timberlake
| The 20/20 Experience
|-
! rowspan="4" align="center"| 2014
|- style="background:#c5e1f0"
| One Direction
| Midnight Memories
| rowspan="4" align="center"| 
|-
| Lorde
| Pure Heroine
|-
| Katy Perry
| Prism
|-
! rowspan="4" align="center"| 2015
|- style="background:#c5e1f0"
| Taylor Swift
| 1989
| rowspan="4" align="center"| 
|-
| Ed Sheeran
| ×
|-
| Sam Smith
| In the Lonely Hour
|-
! rowspan="4" align="center"| 2016
|- style="background:#c5e1f0"
| Justin Bieber
| Purpose
| rowspan="4" align="center"| 
|-
| Adele
| 25
|-
| Drake
| Views
|-
! rowspan="4" align="center"| 2017
|- style="background:#c5e1f0"
| Bruno Mars
| 24K Magic
| rowspan="4" align="center"| 
|-
| Drake
| More Life
|-
| The Weeknd
| Starboy
|-
! rowspan="4" align="center"| 2018
|- style="background:#c5e1f0"
| Taylor Swift
| Reputation
| rowspan="3" align="center"| 
|-
| Drake
| Scorpion
|-
| Ed Sheeran
| ÷
|-
! rowspan="4" align="center"| 2019
|- style="background:#c5e1f0"
| Taylor Swift
| Lover
| style="background:#c5e1f0" rowspan="3" align="center" | 
|-
| Billie Eilish
| When We All Fall Asleep, Where Do We Go?
|-
| Ariana Grande
| Thank U, Next

2020s
{| class="wikitable" width="100%"
|-
! width="10%"| Year
! width="35%"| Artist
! width="50%"| Album
! width="5%"| Ref
|-
! rowspan="4" align="center"| 2020
|- style="background:#c5e1f0"
| Harry Styles
| Fine Line
| rowspan="3" align="center" | 
|-
| Taylor Swift
| Folklore
|-
| The Weeknd
| After Hours
|-
! rowspan="6" align="center"| 2021
|- style="background:#c5e1f0"
| Taylor Swift
| Evermore
| rowspan="5" align="center" | 
|-
| Ariana Grande
| Positions
|-
| The Kid Laroi
| F*ck Love
|-
| Dua Lipa
| Future Nostalgia
|-
| Olivia Rodrigo
| Sour
|-
! rowspan="7" align="center" |2022
|- style="background:#c5e1f0"
| Taylor Swift
| Red (Taylor's Version)
| rowspan="6" align="center" | 
|-
| Adele
| 30
|-
| Bad Bunny
| Un Verano Sin Ti
|-
| Beyoncé
| Renaissance
|-
| Harry Styles
| Harry's House
|-
| The Weeknd| Dawn FM''

Category facts

Multiple awards

 5 awards
 Taylor Swift

 3 awards
 Justin Bieber
 Michael Jackson

 2 awards
 Eagles
 Whitney Houston
 Olivia Newton-John
 One Direction

Multiple nominations

 7 nominations
 Taylor Swift

 5 nominations
 Eagles
 Michael Jackson

 3 nominations
 Justin Bieber
 Mariah Carey
 Fleetwood Mac
 Janet Jackson
 Elton John
 One Direction
 Justin Timberlake

 2 nominations
 Adele
 Bee Gees
 Phil Collins
 Def Leppard
 Drake
 Eminem
 Ariana Grande
 Whitney Houston
 Norah Jones
 Lady Gaga
 Olivia Newton-John
 NSYNC
 Katy Perry
 Britney Spears
 Harry Styles
 U2

References

American Music Awards
1974 establishments in the United States
Pop music awards
Rock music awards
Awards established in 1974
Album awards